Mummy Nanny is an animated television series.

Synopsis
Nile, an Egyptian mummy, is drawn from her sleep that has lasted for five thousand years. She becomes a part of a pair with Capucine and Alex.

French Voice Actors
Patricia Legrand  : Nile
Mark Lesser  : Alex
Kelly Marot  : Capucine
Benoît Allemane  : Akeltonton

English Voice Actors
Mona Marshall : Nile
Joshua Seth : Alex
Steve Blum : Mr. Elsewhere
Wendee Lee : Mrs. Elsewhere
Rebecca Forstadt : Samantha
Paul St. Peter : Uncle Ankh
Michael Sorich : Mr. Big
Bob Buchholz : Stretch
Richard Epcar : Narrator

Technical Information
 Original name: Au pair mummy
 German name: Unsere Mumie ist die Beste
 English name: Mummy Nanny
 Production: Jacky Bretaudeau , Luc Vinciguerra
 Author: Denis Olivieri , Claude Prothée
 Writers: Claude Prothée
 Graphics: Fabrice Parme
 Music: Gérald Roberts , Didier Riey
 Origin: France Germany
 Production houses: Les Cartooneurs Associés , EM TV Merchandising AG , France 2

Episode list
 In the Beginning
 The 5000 Year Vacation !
 A Casket for Two
 Party Animals
 The Sacred Chameleon
 Grandma's Hair-Loom
 Spaced Out
 Mummy Marooned
 Premiere Perils
 Virtual Catastrophe
 Love at Sea
 Surf, Sand & Sarcophagus
 Hair Today, Gone Tomorrow
 Super Model Super Mummy !
 Freezer Burn
 Mutants, Moles & Mummies !
 Camping Catastrophe
 Mummy for Ransom !
 Mummy Misery at Amazingland !
 The Substitute Mummy !
 Fast Food Mummy !
 Kung Fu Mummy
 Sarcophagus Spies
 Television Terror
 Movie Star Mummy
 Mummy Mind Games
 Wasted Talent

External links
 

2001 German television series debuts
German children's animated television series
2001 French television series debuts
2000s French animated television series
French children's animated television series
2001 German television series endings
2001 French television series endings
Television series about mummies